The inaugural Singapore League Cup was held in 2007. The tournament was held before the start of the S.League season that year. Prior to this tournament, there is another tournament with the same name that was held until in 1997 where the Singapore Armed Forces had defeated Geylang United by 1-0 in the final. However that old Singapore League Cup was subsequently renamed into present Singapore Cup and evolved to be the major cup competition in Singapore football. In recent years, invitational foreign teams participated in the Singapore Cup along with the local clubs. The League Cup, however, is solely reserved for domestic clubs.

The 2007 competition was sponsored by SingTel, and officially titled the SingTel League Cup. A direct knockout format was used, with the first round being the quarter-final stage as only eight out of the twelve S.League teams participated in the competition.

The 4 teams who withdrew due to prior pre-season commitments were:
 Geylang United
  Liaoning Guangyuan
 SAFFC
  Young Lions

The winners received a prize of S$20,000 with the runners-up and second runners-up taking home S$10,000 and S$5,000 respectively.

Woodlands Wellington defeated Sengkang Punggol 4-0 in the final to win the first Singapore League Cup. Gombak United defeated Home United in the third-place match 9-8 on penalties following a 1-1 draw.

Results

Round one

Semifinals

Third Place Playoff

Final

References

External links
 RSSSF: Singapore 2007

2007
League Cup
2007 domestic association football cups
February 2007 sports events in Asia